Ian Andrew Engelbrecht (born August 23, 1980 in Bulawayo, Matabeleland is a Zimbabwean cricketer. He has represented Matabeleland cricket team in 9 first-class matches and seven List A matches starting from 1998 to 2006. He is slow left-arm orthodox bowler who took 25 wickets in 2000–01 Logan Cup session but never full field his talent with team.

References

External links
 Career Statistics at Cricinfo
 cricketarchive

1980 births
Living people
Zimbabwean cricketers
Matabeleland cricketers
Sportspeople from Bulawayo
White Zimbabwean sportspeople